The 26th Stinkers Bad Movie Awards were released by the Hastings Bad Cinema Society in 2004 to honour the worst films the film industry had to offer in 2003. The Cat in the Hat received the most nominations with twelve. All nominees and winners, with respective percentages of votes for each category, are listed below. Dishonourable mentions are also featured for Worst Picture (56 total).

Winners and nominees

Worst Film

Dishonourable Mentions 

 Alex & Emma (Warner Bros.)
 Anger Management (Columbia)
 Bad Boys II (Columbia)
 Basic (Columbia)
 Beyond Borders (Paramount)
 Biker Boyz (DreamWorks)
 Bubba Ho-Tep (Vitagraph)
 Bulletproof Monk (MGM)
 Charlie's Angels: Full Throttle (Columbia)
 Chasing Papi (FOX)
 The Core (Paramount)
 Daddy Day Care (Columbia)
 Daredevil (FOX)
 Dreamcatcher (Warner Bros.)
 Duplex (Miramax)
 Elephant (Fine Line)
 Freddy vs. Jason (New Line)
 Gerry (ThinkFilm)
 Gods and Generals (Warner Bros.)
 Grind (Warner Bros.)
 The Guru (Universal)
 Head of State (DreamWorks)
 House of 1000 Corpses (Lionsgate)
 House of the Dead (Artisan)
 How to Lose a Guy in 10 Days (Paramount)
 Hulk (Universal)
 The Hunted (Paramount)
 In the Cut (Screen Gems)
 The In-Laws (Warner Bros.)
 Irréversible (Lionsgate)
 It Runs in the Family (MGM)
 Kangaroo Jack (Warner Bros.)
 Lara Croft: Tomb Raider – The Cradle of Life (Paramount)
 The League of Extraordinary Gentlemen (FOX)
 Legally Blonde 2: Red, White & Blonde (MGM)
 The Life of David Gale (Universal)
 A Man Apart (New Line)
 Marci X (Paramount)
 Masked and Anonymous (Sony Pictures Classics)
 The Matrix Reloaded (Warner Bros.)
 The Matrix Revolutions (Warner Bros.)
 The Medallion (TriStar)
 My Boss's Daughter (Dimension)
 National Security (Columbia)
 People I Know (Miramax)
 The Real Cancun (New Line)
 Scary Movie 3 (Dimension)
 Spy Kids 3-D: Game Over (Dimension)
 The Texas Chainsaw Massacre (New Line)
 21 Grams (Focus)
 Uptown Girls (MGM)
 View from the Top (Miramax)
 What a Girl Wants (Warner Bros.)
 Wonderland (Lionsgate)
 Wrong Turn (FOX)
 X2 (FOX)

Worst Director

Worst Actor

Worst Actress

Worst Supporting Actor

Worst Supporting Actress

Worst Screenplay for a Film Grossing More Than $100M Worldwide Using Hollywood Math

Most Painfully Unfunny Comedy

Worst Song or Song Performance in a Film or Its End Credits

Most Intrusive Musical Score

Worst On-Screen Couple

Most Annoying Fake Accent (Male)

Most Annoying Fake Accent (Female)

Worst Sequel

The Spencer Breslin Award (for Worst Performance by a Child in a Feature Role) 

 Note: only Stinkers founders Mike Lancaster and Ray Wright were allowed to pick the winner here, which is why no percentages are listed.

Least "Special" Special Effects

Worst On-Screen Group

Most Annoying Non-Human Character

Most Overrated Movie

Films with multiple wins and nominations

The following films received multiple nominations:

The following films received multiple wins:

References 

Stinkers Bad Movie Awards
Stinkers Bad Movie Awards